The Wolford-Wilson Sailwing is an American single place homebuilt aircraft.

Design and development
The Sailwing is a single place, open cockpit, twin engine pusher with an inverted V-tail and conventional landing gear. The aircraft uses an aluminum leading edge with wire support and Dacron covering, rather than a spar. Roll control is performed with wing-warping.

Specifications (Sailwing)

See also

References

Homebuilt aircraft
V-tail aircraft
Twin-engined pusher aircraft